Arylsulfatase A (or cerebroside-sulfatase) is an enzyme that breaks down sulfatides, namely cerebroside 3-sulfate into cerebroside and sulfate. In humans, arylsulfatase A is encoded by the ARSA gene.

Pathology
A deficiency is associated with metachromatic leukodystrophy, an autosomal recessive disease.

Biochemistry

Enzyme regulation
Arylsulfatase A is inhibited by phosphate, which forms a covalent bond with the active site 3-oxoalanine.

References

Further reading

External links
  GeneReviews/NCBI/NIH/UW entry on Arylsulfatase A Deficiency - Metachromatic Leukodystrophy
  OMIM entries on ARSA Deficiency